The Australian International School (AIS) is an Australian private international school located in District 2 of Ho Chi Minh City, Vietnam. The school provides an education to students from early childhood pre-school through Year 13.

Endorsed as an International Baccalaureate World School, the AIS offers the IB Primary Year Programme and IB Diploma* (since August 2013) in the Primary School and Senior School, respectively. In the Middle School, it follows the Cambridge Secondary Programme, which leads to the International General Certificate of Secondary Education (IGCSE) examinations at the end of the Middle School (or Year 11).

The Australian International School and ACG International School Vietnam merged in July 2013 to become the Australian International School. The school has over 1,400 students at three purpose-built campuses in District 2. AIS is a member of the Academic Colleges Group (ACG). ACG is an international education company founded in 1995 with member schools in New Zealand and South East Asia.

Campuses

The school operates three campuses:

 Thu Thiem campus is the main AIS campus and is located in the new urban area of Thu Thiem.  It is a purpose-built, modern on 1.6 hectares of land.  The campus has a Science Wing and Computer Laboratories, including an iMac Suite; Comprehensive Art Facilities; dedicated studios for art, technology,  dance and music; and a large auditorium for hosting performances and exhibitions. The campus also has sporting facilities – a 25m salt-water swimming pool and a ‘learn to swim’ wading pool, 6 basketball courts, a tennis court and outdoor fields for soccer and other sports, a health and fitness center plus an air-conditioned indoor gymnasium.
 Thao Dien campus is situated in the An Phu Superior Compound, Thao Dien which is home to a large immigrant community.  It is linked to the main campus by a short mini bus ride.
 Xi campus is a Kindergarten for toddlers up to the age of 5.  It is located adjacent to the residential complex, XI Riverview Place.  This Kindergarten has its own landscaped playgrounds, an indoor soft play room, a splash pool and cooking facilities on-site.

AIS community

The AIS community consists of 40 different nationalities and teachers from UK, USA, Australia, New Zealand, Canada, France, South Korea, China and Vietnam. Students engage in charity events such as the Terry Fox Run, the BBGV Fun Run, World Humanitarian Day in aid of raising money for disadvantaged families. The Community has together raised more than 200 million VND. Parents at AIS volunteer in school events such as International Day; Welcome Back BBQ’ Book Week, etc. under the umbrella of the PFG (Parents & Friends Group). AIS parents are often business owners, general managers, CEOs or occupy other senior positions professionally.

Sports

AIS runs an U11 Basketball, football, netball and swimming as well as compete in the annual Athletics Championships and Cross Country. AIS also competes in the U14 and U19 football and basketball competitions as well as Secondary Swim meets. The Secondary students compete in the athletics and cross country. There is an Under 19 Boys volleyball team. The sports teams play against other international schools from HCMC in a league called SISAC. They play fixtures and compete in a tournament at the end of the season.
 
AIS will be hosting an Australian International Schools Association (AISA) Games in late October where other AIS schools from around Asia will compete in swimming, netball, basketball and football.

References

External links
Official Website

Ho Chi Minh City
Educational institutions established in 2006
International schools in Ho Chi Minh City
2006 establishments in Vietnam